Air Bubble may refer to:
Air Bubble (band), Dutch band
Air bubble, in physics